The Directorate-General for Competition (DG COMP) is a Directorate-General of the European Commission, located in Brussels. The DG Competition employs around 850 officials, as well as a number of seconded national officials, among other from national competition authorities. It is responsible for establishing and implementing competition policy for the European Union. DG Competition has a dual role in antitrust enforcement: an investigative role and a decision-making role. The current Director-General is Olivier Guersent.

DG Competition is also considered to be one of the most sophisticated antitrust enforcers in the world, alongside the US’ Federal Trade Commission and the Antitrust Division of the Department of Justice. Its fines to corporations climbed from €3.4bn between 2000 and 2004, to €9.4bn between 2005 and 2009. Between 2010 and 2012, it totalled €5.4bn.

The DG Competition policy areas include the following: 
 antitrust (agreements and conduct prohibited under Articles 101 and 102 of the TFEU),
 mergers (Commission Regulation (EC) No 802/2004 implementing Council Regulation (EC) No 139/2004 (The "Implementing Regulation") and its annexes (Form CO, Short Form CO and Form RS)),
 liberalisation (Article 106 of the TFEU),
 state aid - ensuring that government interventions do not distort competition within the EU by selectively benefiting one company or a subset of companies over others (Articles 107 - 109 of the TFEU),
 international cooperation.

The DG Competition is led by commissioner Margrethe Vestager, who is currently serving a second five-year term ending in 2024, in addition to the position of executive vice president for digital. Ernst Albrecht, future Minister-President of Lower Saxony and father of current President of the European Commission Ursula von der Leyen notably held the position.

See also
 European Commissioner for Competition
 European Union competition law
 European Union v. Microsoft

References

External links
 Directorate-General for Competition

Competition
Competition regulators
Regulation in the European Union